PQ1 or variation, may refer to:

 Convoy PQ 1, WWII Allied Arctic Convoy
 PQ1: Practical Intelligence Quotient, video game
 Police Quest I: In Pursuit of the Death Angel, video game
 PQ1, a rating used for the UK Royal Mail in Address Point

See also
 PQ (disambiguation)
 PQI (disambiguation)
 PQL (disambiguation)